Nimmakuru is a village in Krishna district of the Indian state of Andhra Pradesh. It is located in Pamarru mandal of Gudivada revenue division. It is the birth place of former and the first non-Congress Chief minister of Andhra Pradesh and Telugu film actor N. T. Rama Rao, his son and TDP charioteer Nandamuri Harikrishna and current MAA president Gadde Rajendra Prasad.

References

Villages in Krishna district

Notables
 N.T.Rama Rao
 Gadde Rajendra Prasad